Supralingua is an album by former Grateful Dead drummer Mickey Hart and his percussion ensemble Planet Drum.  It was released on CD by Rykodisc Records on August 4, 1998.

Like the band's previous album, Planet Drum, Supralingua showcases drum music from multiple cultures, combined to produce a percussion-based world music sound.  It also incorporates samples and computer generated sounds, some of them created using a computer workstation called RAMU (Random Access Musical Universe).  The name of the album means "beyond language" or "beyond words".

Supralingua reached number 4 on the Billboard chart for Top World Music Albums.

Critical reception

On Allmusic, Stephen Thomas Erlewine wrote, "Basically, Supralingua is a continuation of the direction [Hart] began with Planet Drum, boasting a similar selection of polyrhythmic, multicultural pieces. There aren't really any songs on the record — just extended grooves, where even the vocals fit into the gigantic, everlasting drum beats. To some, this can be quite monotonous, to others utterly mesmerizing — there's no middle ground, really, and it all depends on whether the strength of the grooves and their inherent mysticism outweigh the formless compositions.".

In The Music Box, John Metzger said, "Hart draws not only upon his past aural paintings with Planet Drum, but also upon his collaborations with the Gyuto monks, which adds a supernatural aura to "Angola". He also applies his experiences with the Mystery Box album and tour in creating much tighter song arrangements while allowing a natural groove to form and flow.... Supralingua is a serious, mind-bending, psychedelic journey. It's a surreal, spiritual experience that is full of rich textures and dense grooves. Anyone even remotely curious about the power of drumming will find not only that the album's forceful energy is immediately overwhelming but also that it will lead to enlightenment.".

Track listing

Supralingua
"Angola" (Sikiru Adepoju, David Garibaldi, Mickey Hart, Giovanni Hidalgo, Zakir Hussain, Bakithi Kumalo) – 4:54
"Yabu" (Garibaldi, Hart, Hidalgo, Hussain, Kumalo, Babatunde Olatunji) – 4:44
"Endless River" (Adepoju, Garibaldi, Hart, Hidalgo, Hussain, Kumalo, Rebeca Mauleón) – 2:50
"Umayeyo" (Adepoju, Garibaldi, Hart, Hidalgo, Hussain, Kumalo) – 6:03
"Secret Meeting Place" (Adepoju, Garibaldi, Hart, Hidalgo, Hussain, Kumalo) – 3:13
"Tall Grass" (Adepoju, Garibaldi, Hart, Hidalgo, Hussain, Kumalo) – 5:39
"Umasha" (Garibaldi, Hart, Hidalgo, Hussain, Kumalo) – 5:22
"Frog Dance" (Adepoju, Garibaldi, Hart, Hidalgo, Hussain) – 4:46
"Damawoo" (Adepoju, Garibaldi, Hart, Hussain) – 3:05
"Indoscrub" (Garibaldi, Hart, Hidalgo, Hussain, Kumalo) – 4:45
"Wheel of Time" (Hart, Hussain) – 6:16
"Space Dust" (Adepoju, Garibaldi, Hart, Hidalgo, Hussain, Kumalo) – 2:53

Bonus disc
"Umasha" (Strawberry Swamp Fever Mix) – 6:24
"Yabu" (Transmigration Mix #2) – 5:49
"Umayeyo" (Slakked Plastik Remix) – 8:27
"Wheel of Time" (Stolen Moments Real Time Dub Crime Remix) – 6:22

"Video Interview with Mickey Hart" (Jeff Salt, Interviewer)

Personnel

Musicians
Planet Drum:
Mickey Hart – drums, percussion, RAMU, vocals
Sikiru Adepoju – drums, percussion, vocals
David Garibaldi – drum kit, percussion
Giovanni Hidalgo – drums, percussion, vocals
Zakir Hussain – drums, percussion, vocals
Bakithi Kumalo – electric bass, drums, percussion, vocals
Additional musicians:
Jorgé Bermudez – drums, percussion
Joey Blake – vocals
Bobi Céspedes – vocals
Jesus Diaz – vocals
Chalo Eduardo – drums, percussion
Reya Hart – vocal sample
Raz Kennedy – vocals
Alan Kushan – vocals
Rebeca Mauleón – vocals
Airto Moreira – drums, percussion
Babatunde Olatunji – vocal sample
Mimi Spencer – drums, percussion
Graham Wiggins – didgeridoo sample
Gyüto Monks Tantric Choir – vocal sample

Production
Mickey Hart – producer, liner notes
Candice Pacheco – associate producer, sound designer
Tom Flye – engineer, recording
Zac Allentuck – assistant engineer
Zakir Hussain – pre-production
Kevin Sellers – Pro Tools editor
Mark Jeffrey – additional editing
Joe Gastwirt – mastering
Fredric Lieberman – liner notes
John Werner – photography
Stevee Postman – illustration, design
Steven Jurgensmeyer – illustration, design

References

Mickey Hart albums
1998 albums
Rykodisc albums
Albums produced by Mickey Hart